Sentrin-specific protease 8 is an enzyme that in humans is encoded by the SENP8 gene.

NEDD8 (MIM 603171) is a ubiquitin-like protein that becomes conjugated to the cullin (see CUL1; MIM 603134) subunit of several ubiquitin ligases. This conjugation, called neddylation, is required for optimal ubiquitin ligase activity. NEDD8-specific deneddylases, such as NEDP1, or DEN1, are required to process the NEDD8 propeptide at a C-terminal diglycine motif and to remove NEDD8 from cullins (Gan-Erdene et al., 2003).[supplied by OMIM]

References

Further reading

External links